Nathan Katz may refer to:

 Nathan Katz (professor) (born 1948), Jewish American professor at Florida International University, specialising in Indian Jewish communities
 Nathan Katz (poet) (1892–1981), Jewish Alsatian poet
 Nathan Katz (judoka) (born 1995), Australian judoka

See also
 Katz (name)